The 1987–88 First Vienna FC season was probably the most successful season in club history since 1954–55. Under coach Ernst Dokupil the team finished fourth in the domestic league and qualified for the 1988–89 UEFA Cup. This was their first appearance in a European competition.

Squad

Squad and statistics

|-
! colspan="12" style="background:#dcdcdc; text-align:center;"| Goalkeepers

|-
! colspan="12" style="background:#dcdcdc; text-align:center;"| Defenders

|-
! colspan="12" style="background:#dcdcdc; text-align:center;"| Midfielders

|-
! colspan="12" style="background:#dcdcdc; text-align:center;"| Forwards

|}

References

Vienna
First Vienna FC seasons